The Biellese Alps (Alpi Biellesi or Prealpi Biellesi in Italian) are a sub-range of the Pennine Alps located between Piemonte and Aosta Valley (Italy).

Etymology 
Alpi Biellesi literally means Alps of Biellese; Biellese is the geographical and historical area surrounding Biella, nowadays included in the province of Biella.

Geography 
Administratively most part of the range belongs to the province of Biella, while its northern part falls in the province of Vercelli and the western one is divided between Province of Turin and Aosta Valley.

SOIUSA classification 
According to SOIUSA (International Standardized Mountain Subdivision of the Alps) the mountain range is an Alpine supergroup classified in the following way:
 main part = Western Alps
 major sector = North-Western Alps
 section = Pennine Alps
 subsection = Southern Valsesia Alps
 supergroup =Alpi Biellesi
 code = I/B-9.IV-A

Borders 
Borders of the Alpi Biellesi are:
 Colle del Loo (2,452 m) and Valsesia from Val Vogna to Varallo Sesia (north),
 Valsesia from Varallo Sesia to Gattinara (east),
 Po plain between Gattinara and Ivrea (south),
 Dora Baltea until Pont Saint Martin and Lys creek until Gaby and Colle del Loo (west).

Subdivision 

The Alpi Biellesi are divided into two alpine groups, one of them further subdivided in subgroups (in brackets is reported their SOIUSA code):
 Catena Tre Vescovi - Mars (A.1)
 Catena Monte Bo - Barone (A.2)
 Costiera Talamone-Barone (A.2.a)
 Costiera Monte Bo-Punta del Cravile-Monticchio (A.2.b)
These two subgroups are connected by Bocchetta del Croso.

Geology 
From the geological point of view the Alpi Biellesi are composed by an alpine zone in the strict sense of the word and a prealpine zone, divided by the Insubric line (locally named Linea del Canavese). This important geologic fault, which forms the border between the Adriatic plate and the European plate, crosses Biellese from SW to NE through Bocchetto di Sessera and Bocchetta della Boscarola passes. Thus hills and mountains (i.e. Monte Barone) located south-east of the line can be considered part of southern Apulian foreland while most part of the range, located NW of the line, geologically belongs to the crystalline zone of the Alps.

Notable summits

Notable passes

Winter sports 

In the Alpi Biellesi are located some ski resorts: Oropa (Biella) in the western part, with downhill skiing slopes ranging from 1,335 to 2,391 m;
Alpe di Mera (Scopello) and Bielmonte in the eastern part of the range. Near Bielmonte is also possible to practice cross country skiing with more than 30 km of maintained trails starting from Bocchetto Sessera (1,373 m).

Hiking and climbing 
Many climbing routes of varying length and difficulty are described across the mountain range. Some of the most renowned are in the monte Mars area, like via Innominata and cresta dei Carisey. In the Alpi Biellesi there also are several vie ferratas, particularly around Oropa.

The Alta Via delle Alpi Biellesi (literally high way of the Alpi Biellesi), a long-distance hiking trail which requires some climbing skills, covers the mountain range starting from Piedicavallo and ending in the village of Bagneri (Muzzano). The trekking is usually divided into five stretches and along it is possible to get food and accommodation in the following alpine huts: rifugio Rivetti, rifugio della Vecchia, capanna Renata al Monte Camino, rifugio Coda and rifugio Mombarone.

Bibliography

Maps
 Italian official cartography (Istituto Geografico Militare - IGM); on-line version: www.pcn.minambiente.it
 Provincia di Biella cartography: Carta dei sentieri della Provincia di Biella, 1:25.00 scale, 2004; on line version: webgis.provincia.biella.it

See also

 Sessera Valley
 Cervo Valley
 Strona di Mosso Valley

References
This article was originally translated from its counterpart on the Italian Wikipedia, specifically from this version.

External links

 http://www.alpibiellesi.it
 Montagnabiellese.com

 
Pennine Alps
Mountain ranges of Italy
Mountain ranges of Piedmont
Province of Biella